This is  a list of every Vanderbilt Commodores football team quarterback and the years they participated on the Vanderbilt Commodores football team.  Vanderbilt quarterbacks have led Vanderbilt to 583 wins, 7 bowl games, and 4 bowl victories. Clyde Berryman selected Vanderbilt for two National Championships.

Five Vanderbilt quarterbacks have been taken in the National Football League draft since 1936.  Including the NFL, Vanderbilt quarterbacks have also played professionally in the Arena Football League and United States Football League.  7 Vanderbilt quarterbacks went on to be head coaches in Division I-A or professional football. 2 Vanderbilt quarterbacks are members of the College Football Hall of Fame.

Vanderbilt quarterbacks have played prominent roles in American society off the gridiron as well.  Irby Curry, the starting quarterback for the "point-a-minute" 1915 Vanderbilt Commodores football team, served in World War I after graduating in 1916, dying in aerial combat in France. Rand Dixon was a decorated World War II veteran.

Main starting quarterbacks

1890 to 1894 (incomplete)

The following players were the predominant quarters for the Commodores each season the team was a non-conference independent team, following the birth of Vanderbilt football.

1895 to 1918

The following quarterbacks were the predominant quarters for the Commodores each season after the establishment of the Southern Intercollegiate Athletic Association until the end of the war.

1919 to 1932

The following quarterbacks were the predominant quarters for the Commodores each season after the First World War and before the founding of the SEC in 1932. In 1922 the team joined the Southern Conference.

1933 to 1955 (incomplete)

The following players were the predominant quarters for the Commodores each season the team was a member of the Southeastern Conference, until its first bowl victory in the 1955 Gator Bowl.

1956 to present

The following players were the predominant quarters for the Commodores each season after the team's first bowl victory in the 1955 Gator Bowl.

Other starting quarterbacks
These are quarterbacks that started a few games in the season for special cases, or were backs who often passed the ball.

References

Vanderbilt
Quarterbacks
Vanderbilt Commodores quarterbacks